Patterson High School is the name of several educational institutions:

Paterson Catholic High School in Paterson, New Jersey
Patterson High School (California) in Patterson, California
Patterson High School (Louisiana) in Patterson, Louisiana
Patterson Mill Middle/High School in Bel Air, Maryland
Patterson Senior High (Baltimore, Maryland) in Baltimore, Maryland